Loren Brichter is an American software developer who is best known for creating Tweetie and the pull-to-refresh interaction technique.

Personal life and influence
Loren Brichter was born in Manhattan, New York on November 15, 1984. He is a son of contractor Gabor Brichter and real estate entrepreneur, restauranteur and designer Christina Sidoti. Brichter was first introduced to programming by his middle school teacher, Michael Tempel, with Logo. He then explored further in high school, got into Cocoa programming, and picked up C, Objective-C as well as web programming with the help of his teacher, Chris Lehmann. Together with Jean Whitehead, they have three  children.

Tufts University
Brichter attended Tufts University where he initially intended to study Computer Science. He then switched majors twice, first to Computer Engineering, then to Electrical Engineering. He graduated with a degree in Electrical Engineering with a minor in Computer Science. He was offered free masters by the university, which he declined so that he could start his career. Prior to his graduation, he had considered dropping out early due to a different job offer from Apple by the beginning of his senior year. However, his family and his girlfriend convinced him to reject it so that he could graduate. Later on, he then got a new offer to work on the then secret iPhone and iPad project, which he accepted and worked on after he graduated.

Career timeline
2006 - 2007:  Worked at Apple as part of a five-person team responsible for making the iPhone's graphics hardware and software communicate.  He left the company after iPhone 1.0 was complete.

2007 - 2010:  Founded his own company, ate bits in 2007 and released a small drawing app for Mac - Scribbles. Brichter then released his second app Tweetie in 2008, where the Pull-to-Refresh interaction technique was born. In the same year, Brichter also co-founded a company Borange. 
 2009 recipient Apple Designer of Year award. 

2010 - 2011: Brichter worked for Twitter during this time after he sold Tweetie along with his whole company in 2010.

2011 - now: Upon leaving Twitter in November 2011, Brichter refounded atebits, which is a whole different company utilizing the same name as his startup from before. The company then released a word game app Letterpress in 2012, which was later sold to Solebon in early 2016. After his time on Twitter, Brichter was also asked by Mike Matas, an ex-colleague at Apple, to help with the Paper app that Facebook was developing. The app was released in 2014. Although Paper did not incorporate the Pull-to-Refresh gesture that Brichter invented, the duo created new gestures and ideas for the project.  Brichter's current plans include advising a few companies and spending most of his time working on his own projects.

atebits
atebits was first founded individually by Loren in 2007 after he left Apple. It was sold to Twitter in 2010. In 2012, following Brichter's departure from Twitter, he started a new company, again using the name atebits. The goal of the company is to create great apps for Apple devices such as iPhone, iPad, and Mac. 

The company's name is a play on technical words in computer science. "Ate" sounds like "eight," which is the number of bits in a byte. And "byte" sounds like "bite," which, like "ate," is related to eating.

atebits' first app was Scribbles, released in 2007. It is a basic drawing app for the Mac, inspired by MacPaint. Scribbles offers some more advanced features than other basic drawing applications like MacPaint and Microsoft Paint. For instance, it allows for drawing on multiple layers in one image. Scribbles also use a hybrid vector rendering engine. As a result, resizing, scaling, zooming, and exporting images at high resolution can all be done with no reduction in quality. The app also allows users to share their illustrations with one another through integration with the Scribbles Gallery. Scribbles was Brichter's first attempt at building a custom UI framework.

In 2008, atebits released Tweetie, a Twitter app for iOS. Tweetie for Mac followed in 2009. Tweetie's use of innovative user interface interactions such as Pull-to-Refresh garnered increased recognition of Brichter by the design community.

After Brichter re-founded the company, atebits released Letterpress in 2012. Letterpress is a multiplayer word game that connects players using Apple's social gaming network, Game Center. Although Letterpress is one of Brichter's more recent creations, it has already been in his old to-do list for a while, which he only managed to get to work on after he left Twitter. One of the reasons for the app's name was that the whole game operates with letters being pressed by a player's finger. When Brichter first created the game, his wife was his first beta tester, and the rules of the game evolved from beta tests. In early 2016, Letterpress was sold to Solebon.

Tweetie
Tweetie was launched in 2008 and it was created to fill the absence of an in-house Twitter app for the Apple iPhone platform. Later on, in April 2009, Brichter also released Tweetie for Mac. Tweetie for both platforms was acquired by Twitter a year later.

Borange
In 2008, Brichter founded Borange with Mason Lee and Martin Turon, while he was living in Berkeley, California. The company has created two apps, the first being Borange, a social availability app, that enables users to keep track of their friends’ activities through a social timeline view on their mobile device. By allowing users to privately share their recent availability and location with people from their address book, Borange aims to improve the experience of users in arranging mutually convenient times to meet on short notice. The second app, Textie, is a free messaging app across mobile devices. Both apps under Borange were released before push notifications or iMessage were introduced, creating a need for them in the market.

Interaction Techniques

Pull-to-Refresh
Brichter is the creator of the Pull-to-Refresh gesture that first came out on Tweetie 2.0 for iPhone. The gesture allows a user to pull vertically downwards on a touchscreen before releasing, to allow the page to refresh as opposed to former methods of pressing a refresh button. This gesture has since then been adopted by many apps on mobile devices, such as Mail in iOS.

Cell Swipe
Cell Swipe was also created by Brichter and released in Tweetie. The gesture involves swiping a cell off the screen to reveal a set of hidden icons and features. An example would be the cells in Tweetbot, where swiping them reveals options to retweet, reply and so on.

Sliding Panels
The idea of sliding panels first emerged in Brichter's creation of Twitter for iPad where the panels would be horizontally stacked and swiped in by gesture. The panels of data that are swiped in created layers of tweets, people, and information that allow a user to browse increasingly more information  while keeping their last state and path back. This feature is also currently adopted by other apps such as the mobile Facebook and Spotify apps.

Vertical List Icons
Other than gestures, Brichter has also introduced a familiar UI design pattern that first came out in Tweetie for Mac 1.0. This design is a vertical list of icons by a border of the screen that displays the different tabs that users may navigate through in the app. This pattern has since been employed by some Mac apps such as Slack and Tweetbot.

References

1984 births
Living people
American computer programmers
Tufts University School of Engineering alumni